The Osage Round House is a 16-sided structure and is the only such round house standing in Osage County, Oklahoma.

Description and history 
It is located on a 40 acres platted separately from the rest of Hominy, and is owned by the Osage Nation. The top of the roof is an opening which is covered with a small conical roof. The vent is used for ventilation, activated by opening the windows and doors. The peak is also used as a bell tower.

It was added to the National Register of Historic Places on May 16, 1979.

References

Houses in Osage County, Oklahoma
Houses on the National Register of Historic Places in Oklahoma
Hominy, Oklahoma
National Register of Historic Places in Osage County, Oklahoma
Houses completed in 1919